Cingulina magna is a species of sea snail, a marine gastropod mollusk in the family Pyramidellidae, the pyrams and their allies.

Distribution
This marine species occurs off the coasts of Victoria, Australia, within the Bass Strait between Victoria and Tasmania.

References

 May, W.L. (1923). An Illustrated Index of Tasmanian Shells. Hobart : Government Printer. 100 pp
 Cotton, B.C. & Godfrey, F.K. (1932). South Australian Shells. Part 6. South Australian Naturalist. 14 (1): 16-44

External links
 To World Register of Marine Species

Pyramidellidae
Gastropods described in 1910